Desmond Castle may refer to:
Desmond Castle (Adare)
Desmond Castle (Askeaton)
Desmond Castle (Kinsale)
Desmond Hall and Castle, Newcastle West
any other castle built or belonging to the Earls of Desmond